Tubikənd (also, Tubikend, Tubukend, and Tuvikend) is   The village forms part of the municipality of Qoşakənd.

References 

Populated places in Ismayilli District